Appraisal Subordination Entitlement Reduction (ASER) or collateral valuation adjustments (CVA) are commercial mortgage-backed security (CMBS) structuring innovations designed to improve overall transaction credit quality.  Appraisal Reductions were created in response to rating agency concerns that, without such an adjustment, cash flow from mortgages likely to default would be paid to the first-loss class.  The rationale behind appraisal reductions is to support proactively the credit rating of senior CMBS tranches by reducing cash-flow payments to the subordinate tranches.

See also 
 REMIC
 Commercial mortgage-backed security
 Residential mortgage-backed security

Mortgage industry of the United States